Toba Batak is an Austronesian language spoken in North Sumatra province in Indonesia. It is part of a group of languages called Batak.

There are approximately 1,610,000 Toba Batak speakers, living to the east, west and south of Lake Toba. Historically it was written using Batak script, but the Latin script is now used for most writing.

Nomenclature

The name of this language arises from a rich and complex history of ethnic identity in colonial and post-colonial Indonesia.  It is a generic name for the common language used by the people of the districts of Toba, Uluan, Humbang, Habinsaran, Samosir, and Silindung, centered upon the Island of Sumatra; more particularly, at Lake Toba. Linguistically and culturally these tribes of people are closely related.  Other nearby communities such as  Silalahi and Tongging may also be classified as speakers of Toba Batak.

The term Toba Batak is, itself, a derivation of the Toba Batak language.  As such, it is used both as a noun and an adjective, both to describe a language, and also to describe the people who speak the language.

Among the aforementioned districts, Toba is the most densely populated and politically the most prominent district so that Toba Batak became a label for all communities speaking a dialect closely akin to the dialect spoken in Toba. In contemporary Indonesia the language is seldom referred to as Toba Batak, but more commonly and simply as Batak. This "Batak" language is different from the languages of other Batak people that can be divided into speaking a northern Batak dialect (Karo Batak, and Pakpak-Dairi Batak – linguistically this dialect group also includes the culturally very different Alas people), a central Batak dialect (Simalungun) and closely related other southern Batak dialects such as Angkola and Mandailing.

Background

There are several dictionaries and grammars for each of the five major dialects of Batak (Angkola-Mandailing, Toba, Simalungun, Pakpak-Dairi, and Karo). Specifically for Toba Batak the most important dictionaries are that of Johannes Warneck (Toba-German) and Herman Neubronner van der Tuuk (Toba-Dutch). The latter was also involved in translating the Christian Bible into Toba Batak.

Phonology 
This description follows Nababan (1981).

Consonants

Vowels 

Note:
 only occurs in loanwords from Indonesian.

Stress 
Stress is phonemic, e.g.  'height' vs.  'high';  'black dye' vs.  'your sibling'.

Syntax

Toba Batak has verb-initial, VOS word order, as with many Austronesian languages. In (1), the verb  'eat' precedes the object  'cake', and the verb phrase precedes  'the child'.

SVO word order (as in English), however, is also very common (Cole & Hermon 2008). In (2), the subject  'this child' precedes the verb phrase  'hit the dog'.

Cole and Hermon (2008) claim that VOS order is the result of VP-raising (specifically, of VoiceP) (Figure 1). Then, the subject may optionally raise over the verb phrase because of information structure. This analysis provides a basis for understanding Austronesian languages that have more fully become SVO (e.g. Indonesian: Chung 2008; Jarai: Jensen 2014).

Like many Austronesian languages (e.g. Tagalog), DP wh-movement is subject to an extraction restriction (e.g. Rackowski & Richards 2005). The verb in (3a) must agree with  'what' (in (3a): TT or "theme-topic") for it to be extracted in front of the verb. If the verb agrees with the subject,  'John' (in (3b): AT or "actor-topic"), aha 'what' may not extract.

TT:theme-topic
AT:actor-topic

Notes

References

 Musgrave, Simon (2001). Non-subject Arguments in Indonesian. Ph.D. Thesis. See page 101 and reference to Cole, Peter & Gabriella Hermon (2000) Word order and binding in Toba Batak.  Paper presented at AFLA 7, Amsterdam

External links

 OLAC resources in and about the Batak Toba language
 Reference to contemporary Batak Bible
 Example translation of Biblical Scripture (published by the Language Museum, a site published by Zhang Hong, an internet consultant and amateur linguist in Beijing China)
 Sejara Indonesia An Online Outline of Indonesia History.

Batak languages
Languages of Indonesia